Novokurmashevo (Yañı Qormaş) is a rural locality (a selo) in Starokurmashevsky Selsoviet, Kushnarenkovsky District, Bashkortostan, Russia. The population was 201 as of 2010. There are 4 streets.

Geography 
Novokurmashevo is located 17 km southwest of Kushnarenkovo (the district's administrative centre) by road. Ibragimovo is the nearest rural locality.

References 

Rural localities in Kushnarenkovsky District